SNVI (Société Nationale des Véhicules Industriels, National Company of Industrial Vehicles in English, or المؤسسة الوطنية للعربات الصناعية in Arabic), is an Algerian company that has produced trucks and buses since 1967. SNVI is a subsidiary of Société Nationale de Construction Mecanique (SONACOME, National Mechanical Construction Company).

History
Sonacome, the parent company of SNVI was founded by the Algerian government on August 9, 1967, through ordonnance 67-150. It inherited French-era's Berliet factories and equipment after the latter ceased operations by 1973.

Facilities
SNVI's headquarters are located in Rouiba, 30 km to the east of Algiers, with branches in Hussein Dey, Constantine, Oran and Ouargla.

Production 
In 2011, the company has made 2007 vehicles. Its ambition is to resume with its 1980s production rate, that was reaching 6000 vehicles per year.

Exports 

SNVI exports its products to several countries such as:

 Democratic Republic of the Congo
 Iraq
 Gabon
 Guinea-Bissau
 Libya
 Mali
 Mauritania
 Niger
 Republic of the Congo
 Senegal
 Tunisia

Models 

SNVI produces trucks, buses, and semi-trailer.

Trucks
SNVI offers a variety of trucks for civilian and military purposes.

Civilian trucks 
 Porteur – SNVI K66
 Porteur – SNVI K120
 Porteur – SNVI C260
 Porteur – SNVI B260
 Porteur – SNVI B400
 Tracteur routier – SNVI TB400
 Tracteur routier – SNVI TC260
 All Terrain – SNVI M120
 All Terrain – SNVI M230

Military trucks 
 SNVI M120
 SNVI M230
 SNVI M260
 SNVI M350
 SNVI K66
 SNVI K120
 SNVI C260
 SNVI B260
 SNVI B400

Buses

Civilian buses 
 Minibus – number of passengers 25
 SNVI Safir – number of passengers 49
 SNVI Numedia Lux – number of passengers 47

Military buses 
 Minibus – number of passengers 36
 Versatile Intervention Vehicle – number of passengers 18

Semi trailers 

 Tanker – 30 000L
 Cement mixer
 Low-boy trailer
 Trailer CEP 3000L
 Tippers

References

External links
 

Bus manufacturers of Algeria
Vehicle manufacturing companies established in 1967
Military vehicle manufacturers
Truck manufacturers of Algeria
Algiers Province
Defence companies of Algeria
Algerian brands
1967 establishments in Algeria